Ma Chao (176–222), courtesy name Mengqi, was a Chinese military general and warlord who lived in the late Eastern Han dynasty and early Three Kingdoms period of China. A descendant of the general Ma Yuan, Ma Chao was the eldest son of Ma Teng, a prominent warlord in Liang Province (covering parts of northwestern China). In 211, he formed a coalition with Han Sui and other northwestern warlords and revolted against the Han central government, which was led by the warlord Cao Cao. The coalition broke up after losing the Battle of Tong Pass against Cao Cao's forces. Ma Chao initially retreated, but later returned to attack and seize control of Liang Province by killing the provincial inspector Wei Kang and forcing Wei Kang's subordinates to submit to him. About a year after Ma Chao started his uprising, Emperor Xian issued an imperial decree ordering the execution of Ma Chao's family members, who were in Ye city at the time. In the meantime, Wei Kang's subordinates, led by Zhao Ang, Yang Fu and others, rebelled against Ma Chao and forced him out of Liang Province. Ma Chao retreated to Hanzhong Commandery, where he borrowed troops from the warlord Zhang Lu, and returned to attack Liang Province but was ultimately defeated and driven back. Ma Chao took shelter under Zhang Lu for a while until around 214, when he heard that the warlord Liu Bei was fighting for control over Yi Province (covering present-day Sichuan and Chongqing) with Yi Province's governor, Liu Zhang. He defected to Liu Bei's side and assisted Liu Bei in capturing Yi Province from Liu Zhang. Ma Chao had served as a general under Liu Bei since then and participated in the Hanzhong Campaign in 219. He died in 222.

Historians and Ma Chao's contemporaries have a generally negative view of him. Apart from committing treason against the Han government under Cao Cao's control, Ma Chao was also notorious for committing a number of acts of cruelty: he betrayed his father when he persuaded Han Sui to join him in his rebellion; he abandoned his wife and son when he defected from Zhang Lu to Liu Bei; he killed Jiang Xu's mother in cold blood after she scolded him; he murdered Zhao Ang and Wang Yi's son after they rebelled against him and forced him out of Liang Province.

In the 14th-century historical novel Romance of the Three Kingdoms, Ma Chao is romanticised as a heroic warrior and one of the Five Tiger Generals under Liu Bei. In the novel, the descriptions of his character and personality, as well as the order of some events involving him, have been significantly modified for dramatic effect. For example, in the novel he started the Battle of Tong Pass to take revenge against Cao Cao for murdering his family, but historically he waged war against Cao Cao first, and then his family members were implicated and executed about one year later. In the novel, he also engaged Xu Chu and Zhang Fei in one-on-one duels at the Battle of Tong Pass and Battle of Jiameng Pass respectively, but historically the duels never took place and the Battle of Jiameng Pass is actually a fictional battle.

Family background
Ma Chao was from Maoling County (茂陵縣), Youfufeng Commandery (右扶風郡), which is located northeast of present-day Xingping, Shaanxi. He was the eldest son of Ma Teng, who descended from Ma Yuan, a general who lived in the early Eastern Han dynasty. Ma Teng's father, Ma Ping (馬平), whose courtesy name was Zishuo (子碩), served as a military officer in Tianshui Commandery (天水郡) during the reign of Emperor Huan. After losing his post, Ma Ping went to live among the Qiang tribes in the region, married a Qiang woman and had a son, Ma Teng. Ma Teng, along with Han Sui and others, were warlords who held considerable influence in Liang Province (covering parts of present-day Shaanxi and Gansu) towards the end of the Eastern Han dynasty and were reluctant to submit to Han rule. In 192, Ma Teng accepted the appointment of General Who Attacks the West (征西將軍) from the Han imperial court and garrisoned his army at Mei County (郿縣). However, he rebelled against the Han dynasty later and attacked the city of Chang'an but failed to conquer it so he retreated back to Liang Province.

Early career
In 197, the warlord Cao Cao – who had become the de facto head of the Han central government – placed Zhong Yao, the Colonel-Director of Retainers (司隷校尉), in charge of guarding the Guanzhong region. Zhong Yao wrote to Ma Teng and Han Sui, explaining to them the benefits of submitting to the Han court and the negative consequences of not doing so. When Cao Cao became the Imperial Chancellor (丞相), he wanted to recruit Ma Chao to serve in the Han government, but Ma refused.

In 202, when Cao Cao was on a series of campaigns to unify northern China after his victory over Yuan Shao at the Battle of Guandu two years earlier, he ordered Zhong Yao to attack Yuan's allies Gao Gan and Guo Yuan in Pingyang (平陽; in present-day Linfen, Shanxi). Ma Teng sent Ma Chao to assist Zhong Yao. Ma Chao served as an Assistant Officer Who Supervises the Army (督軍從事) under Zhong Yao. During the battle, he was hit by a stray arrow in the foot, but he wrapped his foot in a pouch and continued fighting. His subordinate Pang De slew Guo Yuan and they defeated the enemy.

Ma Teng got into conflict with Han Sui later, so he requested to leave Liang Province and work in the capital. He was granted permission and appointed as the Minister of the Guards (衞尉) by the Han court. Ma Chao was appointed as a Lieutenant-General (偏將軍), made a Marquis of a Chief Village (都亭侯), and placed in charge of his father's troops in Liang Province. Ma Chao's younger brothers Ma Xiu (馬休) and Ma Tie (馬鐵) were appointed as a Commandant of Equipage (奉車都尉) and a Commandant of Iron Cavalry (鐵騎都尉) respectively, and were ordered to bring all their family members with them to Ye (in present-day Handan, Hebei). Only Ma Chao remained behind in Liang Province.

Uprising against the Cao Cao controlled Han Government

Battle of Tong Pass

In 211, Cao Cao sent Zhong Yao and Xiahou Yuan to lead an army to attack Zhang Lu in Hanzhong Commandery. They were due to pass through the Guanzhong region along the way. Ma Chao suspected that Cao Cao was planning to attack him, so he contacted Han Sui to form an alliance. He told Han Sui, "Previously, Zhong Yao ordered me to harm you. Now, I know that the people from Guandong (east of Tong Pass) cannot be trusted. Now, I abandon my father, and I'm willing to acknowledge you as my father. You should also abandon your son, and treat me like your son." Han Sui's subordinate, Yan Xing, urged his superior not to cooperate with Ma Chao but Han still agreed to the alliance. Ma Chao also contacted Yang Qiu, Li Kan (李堪), Cheng Yi (成宜), Hou Xuan (侯選), Cheng Yin (程銀), Zhang Heng (張橫), Liang Xing (梁興), Ma Wan (馬玩) and others, and they formed a 100,000 strong coalition army to attack Tong Pass (present-day Tongguan County, Shaanxi). Liu Zhang, the governor of Yi Province (covering present-day Sichuan and Chongqing), wanted to marry his daughter to Ma Chao to build ties with Ma, but Wang Shang (王商), a commandery administrator under Liu Zhang, opposed the idea and said that Ma Chao was courageous but inhumane and untrustworthy.

Cao Cao led an army to Tong Pass to attack Ma Chao and the coalition, resulting in the Battle of Tong Pass. After both sides clashed in a few engagements, Cao Cao had talks with Ma Chao and Han Sui. Ma Chao relied on his great strength and secretly harboured the intention of dashing forth and capturing Cao Cao when they met. However, he did not dare to make his move when Xu Chu, one of Cao Cao's close aides, glared at him. Cao Cao later followed Jia Xu's strategy to sow discord between Ma Chao and Han Sui and make them become suspicious of each other. Taking advantage of the hostility between Ma Chao and Han Sui, Cao Cao launched an attack on the northwestern warlords and defeated them.

Earlier on, when Cao Cao's forces were at Puban (蒲阪; east of present-day Dali County, Shaanxi) and were planning to cross the Wei River and head west, Ma Chao told Han Sui, "We should resist them at the north of the Wei River. Within 20 days, their supply stores on the east of the river will be depleted, after which they will definitely retreat." However, Han Sui rejected his idea and said, "We should send our forces to engage the enemy on the river. Isn't this more direct?" When Cao Cao heard of Ma Chao's plan, he remarked, "If the young horse doesn't die, I can't have a proper burial place."

Battles in Guanzhong

Ma Chao retreated further west after his defeat at Tong Pass. Cao Cao pursued him to Anding (安定; around present-day Pingliang, Gansu) but gave up on the pursuit and headed east after receiving news about unrest in northern China. Yang Fu warned Cao Cao, "Ma Chao has the courage of Han Xin and Ying Bu, and both the Qiang and Rong peoples deeply respect him. If we retreat now and don't station defences here, we'll forfeit all the territories in this area." After Cao Cao left, as Yang Fu predicted, Ma Chao led the various tribes in the region to attack the commanderies and counties in Guanzhong, while the people responded to his call and joined him in the revolt. Ma Chao killed Wei Kang, the Inspector (刺史) of Liang Province, and seized control of Liang Province's capital Jicheng (兾城; in present-day Gangu County, Gansu) and forced Wei Kang's subordinates to submit to him. He then appointed himself General Who Attacks the West (征西將軍) and Governor (牧) of Bing Province, and took charge of military affairs in Liang Province.

While Ma Chao besieged Wei Kang, Xiahou Yuan wanted to lead reinforcements to help him but arrived too late as Ji had already fallen to Ma Chao with Xiahou Yuan still more than 200 li away from Ji. Ma Chao led an army out to face Xiahou Yuan who would prove unable to defeat Ma Chao and decided to withdraw his troops when he heard that the Di tribes in Qian County had started a rebellion.

Wei Kang's former subordinates – Yang Fu, Jiang Xu, Liang Kuan (梁寬), Zhao Qu (趙衢) and others – were unhappy with Ma Chao so they plotted to get rid of him. Yang Fu and Jiang Xu rebelled against Ma Chao in Lucheng (鹵城; in present-day southeastern Gansu), while the others in Jicheng pretended to urge Ma to suppress the revolt. Ma Chao followed their advice and led an army to attack Lucheng but could not conquer the city. When he returned to Jicheng, he saw that Liang Kuan and Zhao Qu had closed the city gates and barred him from entering. Zhao Qu and the others also killed Ma Chao's wife and child(ren) in Jicheng.

In the summer of 212, about a year after Ma Chao rebelled against the Cao Cao controlled Han court, Cao Cao forced Emperor Xian to issue a decree ordering the execution of Ma Chao's father Ma Teng and the rest of his family who were with him at the time in Ye (in present-day Handan, Hebei).

Ma Chao fled to Hanzhong, where he borrowed troops from the warlord Zhang Lu, and returned to attack those who drove him out of Guanzhong. He besieged Jiang Xu, Zhao Ang and their allies at Mount Qi (祁山; the mountainous regions around present-day Li County, Gansu) for about 30 days until reinforcements led by Cao Cao's generals Xiahou Yuan and Zhang He showed up and lifted the siege.

Service under Zhang Lu
Ma Chao returned to Hanzhong Commandery after his defeat at Mount Qi and sought shelter under Zhang Lu. Zhang Lu planned to marry his daughter to Ma Chao, but one of Zhang's aides advised him against it, saying, "If a person can't even love his family and relatives, can he still love others?" Zhang Lu then aborted his plan.

On one New Year's Day, a relative of Ma Chao who had also escaped to Hanzhong came to visit him. Ma Chao beat his chest, coughed blood, and said to his relative, "A big family with over a hundred members all sharing the same fate in one day. Now, are there only the two of us to give greetings to each other?"

Ma Chao constantly asked Zhang Lu to give him some troops to attack Liang Province. Zhang Lu agreed, but Ma Chao failed to make any gains from the campaign. Yang Bai (楊白), an officer under Zhang Lu, was jealous of Ma Chao's ability and wanted to harm him. When Ma Chao heard about it, he escaped from Wudu (武都; around present-day Longnan, Gansu) and went to live with the Di people around the area.

Service under Liu Bei
Around 214, the warlord Liu Bei was fighting for control over Yi Province with the provincial governor Liu Zhang. Ma Chao distrusted Zhang Lu and felt that he was not capable of great achievements, so he planned to defect to Liu Bei. When he heard that Liu Bei was besieging Liu Zhang in Chengdu (Yi Province's capital), he wrote a secret letter to Liu Bei, expressing his desire to serve the latter. Liu Bei was pleased to receive Ma Chao's letter and he exclaimed, "Yi Province is mine." He then sent Li Hui to meet Ma Chao and provide supplies and additional troops to Ma, after which Ma led his forces to the north of Chengdu and joined the siege. When the people of Chengdu saw Ma Chao and his troops below the city walls, they were greatly demoralized and fearful. Within ten days of Ma Chao's arrival, Liu Zhang gave up resistance and surrendered to Liu Bei.

After occupying Yi Province, Liu Bei appointed Ma Chao as General Who Pacifies the West (平西將軍) and put him in charge of Linju (臨沮; northeast of present-day Yuan'an County, Hubei). Liu Bei defeated Cao Cao in the Hanzhong Campaign in 219 and declared himself "King of Hanzhong" (漢中王), after which he appointed Ma Chao as General of the Left (左將軍).

In 221, Liu Bei declared himself emperor and established the state of Shu Han. He appointed Ma Chao as General of Agile Cavalry (驃騎將軍) and Governor (牧) of Liang Province. Ma Chao was enfeoffed as the Marquis of Tai District (斄鄉侯). Liu Bei's imperial edict to Ma Chao was as follows:

Peng Yang's case

When Peng Yang, an official under Liu Bei, was about to leave Chengdu to assume his new appointment in Jiangyang, he visited Ma Chao and told him: "You are outside while I am inside. The Empire can be pacified." Ma Chao had recently joined Liu Bei's forces and he was often fearful that he would get into trouble. After hearing what Peng Yang told him, he was shocked as he thought that Peng Yang was asking him to participate in a coup d'état against Liu Bei. However, he remained silent and did not respond. After Peng Yang left, Ma Chao secretly reported him and caused him to be arrested and executed.

Conflict with Guan Yu and Zhang Fei
The Shanyang Gong Zaiji (山陽公載記; Records of the Duke of Shanyang), by Yue Zi (樂資), recorded an incident as follows: 

Pei Songzhi, who annotated Ma Chao's biography in the Sanguozhi, disputed the Shanyang Gong Zaiji account as untruthful and nonsensical. He commented as follows:

Death
Ma Chao died in 222 at the age of 47 (by East Asian age reckoning). His cause of death was not recorded in history. Before his death, he wrote to Liu Bei: "Over 200 members of my family were killed by Cao Cao. I only have my cousin Ma Dai left with me. He will be the one to continue my family line. I entrust him to Your Majesty's care. That is all I have to say." In October or November 260, Liu Bei's son and successor, Liu Shan, granted Ma Chao the posthumous title "Marquis Wei" (威侯).

Family and relatives
Ma Chao's title, Marquis of Tai District (斄鄉侯), was inherited by his son, Ma Cheng (馬承). Ma Chao's daughter married Liu Bei's son Liu Li (劉理), the Prince of Anping (安平王).

Ma Chao had at least two spouses. The first was Lady Yang (楊氏), who was with him when he seized control of Liang Province after the Battle of Tong Pass. She probably bore Ma Chao at least one child, because the Sanguozhi mentioned that Zhao Qu (趙衢), Yin Feng (尹奉) and others killed Ma's family (wife and child(ren)) when they rebelled against him and drove him out of Liang Province. Ma Chao had a second wife, Lady Dong (董氏), who bore him a son, Ma Qiu (馬秋). When Ma Chao escaped from Zhang Lu and defected to Liu Bei, he left them behind in Hanzhong Commandery. Zhang Lu was later defeated by Cao Cao, to whom he surrendered. Cao Cao gave Lady Dong to Yan Pu (閻圃), a former adviser to Zhang Lu, and gave Ma Qiu to Zhang Lu. Zhang Lu personally killed Ma Qiu. It is not known who the mother(s) of Ma Chao's two other children (Ma Cheng and the daughter) were, but she (or they) was probably neither Lady Yang nor Lady Dong.

Ma Chao's younger cousin, Ma Dai, served as a general in Shu Han. His highest appointment was General Who Pacifies the North (平北將軍) and he was also enfeoffed as the Marquis of Chencang (陳倉侯).

Ma Ying-jeou, the President of Taiwan from 2008 to 2016, is an alleged descendant of Ma Chao. Researchers purportedly visited the old residence of Ma's father, Ma Ho-ling, in Kaiyun Town, Hengshan County, Hunan, where they discovered a genealogy book stating that Ma descended from Ma Chao.

Appraisal
Ma Chao was known for his exceptional strength and for the great admiration he possessed among the ethnic tribes of the North. Chen Shou, who wrote Ma Chao's biography in the Sanguozhi, commented on him as such: "Ma Chao relied solely on his Róng/戎 (martial prowess) and his own valor yet caused the extermination of his entire clan. What a great pity! However, he was able to break free from danger and finally reach peace, did all of his actions led him to a better fate?"

Guan Yu once wrote to Zhuge Liang to ask who could compete with Ma Chao when he heard that Ma had recently joined Liu Bei's force. Zhuge Liang replied, "Mengqi (Mao Chao) is proficient in both civil and military affairs. He is fierce and mighty, and a hero of his time. He is comparable to Qing Bu and Peng Yue. He can compete with Yide, but is not as good as the peerless beard."

Yang Fu, one of the officials who opposed Ma Chao in Liang Province, once visited his colleague and relative Jiang Xu and Jiang Xu's mother. He lamented about Ma Chao's murder of Wei Kang and forceful occupation of Liang Province: "[...] Ma Chao betrayed his father, rebelled against the Emperor, and massacred the officers in our province. [...] Ma Chao is strong but iniquitous. He is morally weak and susceptible to temptation and trickery." Yang Fu, Jiang Xu and several others later plotted against Ma Chao and drove him out of Liang Province. Ma Chao fought his way into Licheng (歷城) and captured Jiang Xu's mother. She scolded him, "You're an unfilial son who betrays his own father and a treacherous villain who murders his superior. Heaven and Earth will not forgive you. You should die immediately. How dare you look at me straight in the eye!" Ma Chao was furious and he killed her.

Yang Xi wrote an appraisal on Ma Chao as follows: "The Hussar (or Vaillant Rider (驃騎)) rose up, formed alliances, started an uprising in the Three Qins, and conquered the river and Tong Pass. He rebelled against the imperial court, regardless of whether his followers agreed or disagreed with him. In doing so, he provided an opportunity for the enemy to sow discord between him and his men, resulting in the destruction of his family and forces. He defied morals and ethics, and ended up having to rely on dragons and phoenixes."

The Jin dynasty historian Sun Sheng compared Ma Chao's betrayal of his father Ma Teng to other historical examples of extreme cruelty and inhumaneness, including: the conflict between the Zhou dynasty and the vassal state of Zheng in 720 BCE; in 203 BCE, after Xiang Yu captured Liu Bang's father and threatened to boil him alive if Liu Bang did not surrender, but then Liu Bang asked Xiang Yu to share a bowl of his father's flesh with him.

In Romance of the Three Kingdoms
Ma Chao is featured as a prominent character in some chapters in the 14th-century historical novel Romance of the Three Kingdoms. However, in the novel, the descriptions of his character and personality, as well as the order of some events involving him, had been modified to very large extents for dramatic effect. In the novel, he was nicknamed "Ma Chao the Splendid" for his elaborate armour and grand skill as a warrior, and was one of the Five Tiger Generals under Liu Bei.

Ma Chao is introduced in Chapter 10, where he participates in a campaign led by his father and Han Sui against Li Jue and Guo Si in Chang'an in 192, during which he slays the enemy officers Wang Fang (王方) and Li Meng (李蒙). He does not reappear until Chapter 57, in which he suggests to his father that he could lead the army against Cao Cao at Xuchang in 211 to follow Emperor Xian's orders to slay Cao Cao, but his father tells him to remain in Liang Province and command the Qiang troops there. After his father is killed by Cao Cao, Ma Chao, Han Sui and another eight officers fight against Cao Cao at the Battle of Tong Pass, during which Ma Chao fights with Cao Cao's generals Xu Chu, Yu Jin, Cao Hong and Zhang He, and slays Li Tong. Later, Cao Cao's strategist, Jia Xu, suggests to Cao Cao to send a letter containing errors and markings (making it seem as though the recipient has something to hide) to Han Sui to make Ma Chao falsely believe that Han Sui is maintaining secret contact with Cao Cao. Ma Chao gradually becomes more suspicious of Han Sui, who also has the intention of defecting to Cao Cao's side after learning that Ma Chao no longer trusts him. Han Sui manages to escape when Ma Chao tries to kill him, but his left hand is cut off by Ma during the fight. Ma Chao is eventually defeated by Cao Cao's forces, but manages to escape and find shelter among the Qiang tribes.

Ma Chao later joins forces with Zhang Lu to attack Cao Cao, but fails to make any significant gains. Zhang Lu, who distrusts Ma Chao, sends Yang Bo to spy on Ma, but Yang Bo is later killed. Ma Chao then helps Liu Zhang, the governor of Yi Province, deal with an invasion on Yi Province by Liu Bei. He duels with Liu Bei's sworn brother, Zhang Fei, at the Battle of Jiameng Pass. Later, he is convinced by Li Hui to defect to Liu Bei, who accepts him and makes him a general. He fights for Liu Bei in the Hanzhong Campaign and is later posted to Xiping, where he defends Liu Bei's strongholds from the Xianbei chieftain Kebineng.

Although Ma Chao historically died in 222, in the novel, he is mentioned to be still alive during Zhuge Liang's southern campaign against the Nanman and is in charge of guarding Hanzhong from possible attacks by the state of Cao Wei. He died of illness after Zhuge Liang returned from the campaign. Zhuge Liang tells Zhao Yun that Ma Chao's death felt like the loss of an arm to him.

In popular culture

Ma is sometimes venerated as a door god in Chinese and Taoist temples in Hebei and Henan, usually in partnership with Ma Dai or Zhao Yun.

Ma Chao appears as a strong general in Koei's Romance of the Three Kingdoms strategy game series.

Ma Chao appears as a playable character in Koei's Dynasty Warriors and Warriors Orochi video game series.

In the collectible card game Magic: The Gathering, there is a card named "Ma Chao, Western Warrior" in the Portal Three Kingdoms set.

See also
 Lists of people of the Three Kingdoms

Notes

References

Citations from the Sanguozhi

Citations from annotations to the Sanguozhi

Citations from the Houhanshu

Other citations

Bibliography
 Chen, Shou (3rd century). Records of the Three Kingdoms (Sanguozhi).
 
 Fan, Ye (5th century). Book of the Later Han (Houhanshu).
 Luo, Guanzhong (14th century). Romance of the Three Kingdoms (Sanguo Yanyi).
 Pei, Songzhi (5th century). Annotations to Records of the Three Kingdoms (Sanguozhi zhu).
 Sima, Guang (1084). Zizhi Tongjian.

176 births
222 deaths
Chinese duellists
Chinese gods
Deified Chinese people
Generals under Liu Bei
Han dynasty generals from Shaanxi
Ma Teng and associates
Shu Han generals
Zhang Lu and associates